Władysławowo Port railway station is a railway station serving the town of Władysławowo, in the Pomeranian Voivodeship, Poland. The station is located on the Reda–Hel railway. The train services are operated by Przewozy Regionalne.

The station used to be known as Wielka Wieś.

Modernisation
The station was rebuilt in 2013 as part of the modernisation of the Reda–Hel railway.

Train services
The station is served by the following services:

Regional services (R) Hel - Władysławowo - Reda - Gdynia Główna

During the summer months long-distance services also operate to/from Hel.

References 

 This article is based upon a translation of the Polish language version as of August 2016.

External links

Railway stations in Pomeranian Voivodeship
Puck County